Nyanga Airport  is an airstrip serving the village of Nianga in Kasaï Province, Democratic Republic of the Congo.

See also

Transport in the Democratic Republic of the Congo
List of airports in the Democratic Republic of the Congo

References

External links
 Nyanga
 HERE Maps - Nyanga
 OpenStreetMap - Nyanga
 OurAirports - Nyanga

Airports in Kasaï Province